Dairy Barn was a chain of regional convenience stores located on Long Island, New York, with headquarters in Elwood, New York. The stores were distinguished by their drive-through feature, red barn appearance, and little red silo.

The peak number of operating Dairy Barn stores was approximately 70. Some original Dairy Barn locations remain open as retail establishments retaining the red barn theme.

History
In 1939 Edgar Cosman, a Swiss textile manufacturer with business interests in the United States, purchased the Oak Tree Dairy Farm on Long Island. In 1961 Cosman's son, Dieter Cosman, expanded the dairy's wholesale milk business into a chain of retail, drive-through convenience stores named "Dairy Barn."

References

External links
 Official website of the defunct Dairy Barn- Not Current
 Official Website of the modern day The Barn- Current

Convenience stores of the United States
Companies based in Suffolk County, New York
American companies established in 1961
Retail companies established in 1961
1961 establishments in New York (state)